Manuel Amechazurra was a Philippine-born Spanish footballer who played as a defender. His nickname was Amecha. He is best known for his second spell at FC Barcelona, playing a total of 137 games in the first team and scoring 20 goals.

Amechazurra was one of the most important figures in the amateur beginnings of FC Barcelona, serving as its captain for 5 years between 1909 and 1914, and thus playing a crucial role in Barça's huge sporting success of the early 1910s, winning four championships in Catalonia, three Copa del Reys in Spain and four Pyrenees Cups in a row. In addition to his contributions on the field, he was also one of the club's first undercover professional.

Club career
Originally from the Philippines, he settled in Barcelona as a young man, where he began playing football at his local club FC Irish in 1902. In Irish, Amechazurra stood out as an extraordinary defender, which earned him a move to FC Barcelona in 1906. After two unsuccessful years at Barça, he went to England in 1908 where he played for several clubs such as St. Boniface's College and Stoke Chuchife. In England, he learned the most modern techniques and tactics, which he transported to Barcelona when he returned in 1909.

He played at FC Barcelona until 1915, almost a whole decade with the brief exception of his travels, which made him known among his colleagues with the nickname of the Adventurer. He formed a great defensive partnership with José Irízar. Together with Carles Comamala, Amechazurra was the fundamental head behind piece in Barcelona's first great team, which also had the likes of Paco Bru, Alfredo Massana, the Wallace brothers (Charles and Percy) and Pepe Rodríguez, but it was Amechazurra who was named the team's captain. No one disputed this decision in a time when the captain had the duty of dictating the tactics to be followed (since the coach as we know him today did not exist back then) and who had to make up the line-ups and game plans. Amechazurra captained this team to five Catalan championships including three back-to-back titles between 1909 and 1911, along with four Pyrenees Cups in a row between 1910 and 1913, and three Copa del Rey titles in 1910, 1912 and 1913. In the latter's final, Barça needed three games to beat Real Sociedad and Amechazurra captained in all of them, including the decisive game which Barça won 2–1. Amechazurra played a total of 137 games in the first team and scored 20 goals. 

He is considered the club's first undercover professional at a time when football was amateur. He earned 300 pesetas in disguise in exchange for teaching English to some executives, despite opposition from Joan Gamper. A few months later, players like José Irízar or Alfredo Massana also started to get paid in disguise.

International career 
Like many other FC Barcelona of his time, he played several matches for the Catalan national team in the early 1910s, being one of the eleven footballers who played in the team's first-ever game recognized by FIFA on 20 February 1912, which ended in a 0–7 loss to France.

Honours

Barcelona
Copa del Rey(3): 1910, 1912 and 1913
Campeonato de Cataluña(4): 1908–1909, 1909–1910, 1910–1911, 1912–1913
Pyrenees Cup(4): 1910, 1911, 1912 and 1913

References

1884 births
1965 deaths
Spanish footballers
Footballers from Catalonia
Association football defenders
FC Barcelona players
Catalonia international footballers
Sportspeople from Bacolod
Footballers from Negros Occidental
Spanish people of Filipino descent
Spanish people of Basque descent
Spanish people in the Spanish Philippines